Saint-Georges-de-Livoye is a commune in the Manche department in Normandy in north-western France.

See also
Communes of the Manche department

Places and monuments 

 Saint-Georges Church from 17th century. It contains a statue of Mary Magdalene from the 14th or 15th century classified as an object to the Monument Historique.
 Ponds of the Val de Sée, in the Mill, the water of fishing pond comes from the Bieu, tributary of the Sée, and picnic place.

References

Saintgeorgesdelivoye